Soslan Vyacheslavovich Dzhioyev (born 8 August 1993) is a former Russian football player.

Club career
He made his debut in the Russian Football National League for FC Alania Vladikavkaz on 9 August 2011 in a game against FC Torpedo Vladimir.

References

External links
 
 

1993 births
People from Tskhinvali
Living people
Russian footballers
Association football midfielders
FC Lokomotiv Moscow players
FC Spartak Vladikavkaz players